Chermoshnoy is a rural locality (a khutor) in Dyakonovsky Selsoviet Rural Settlement, Oktyabrsky District, Kursk Oblast, Russia. Population:

Geography 
The khutor is located 62 km from the Russia–Ukraine border, 26 km south-west of Kursk, 11 km south-west of the district center – the urban-type settlement Pryamitsyno, 8.5 km from the selsoviet center – Dyakonovo.

 Climate
Chermoshnoy has a warm-summer humid continental climate (Dfb in the Köppen climate classification).

Transport 

The rural locality is situated 37 km from Kursk Vostochny Airport, 113 km from Belgorod International Airport and 236 km from Voronezh Peter the Great Airport.

References

Notes

Sources

Rural localities in Oktyabrsky District, Kursk Oblast